Stuart Bass, ACE, is an American film and television editor and director. He is best known for his work on the television series The Wonder Years, MacGyver, The Office, Arrested Development, Pushing Daisies, and A Series of Unfortunate Events.

Life and career
Bass was born in Montreal, Canada. He received his B.A. from the University of Wisconsin at Madison in 1978 in Communication Arts and a M.F.A. from the San Francisco Art Institute in 1980. In 2009, The Motion Picture Editors Guild Magazine stated that "Stuart Bass Brings a Cinematic Sensibility to Cutting Comedy". He is a member of American Cinema Editors. He was a governor of the Academy of Television Arts and Sciences from 2007 to 2010 and from 2012 to 2017. He retired as an editor/director in 2019 and is pursuing fine art photography.

Awards and nominations

References

External links
 
 

Living people
American television editors
American film editors
Year of birth missing (living people)